TV Tan EP is a single by The Wildhearts released in 1993. The sticker that came attached to the EP in both its CD and 12" formats contained the words "Contains 3 previously unreleased songs and no artificial additives". The single was also released on a 7" picture disc as 'TV Tan'. It peaked at No. 53 on the UK Singles Chart.

Track listing
"TV Tan"
"Show a Little Emotion"
"Dangerlust"
"Down on London"

References

The Wildhearts EPs
1993 EPs
East West Records EPs